The 2018 Challenger de Buenos Aires was a professional tennis tournament played on clay courts. It was the eighth edition of the tournament which was part of the 2018 ATP Challenger Tour. It took place in Buenos Aires, Argentina between 12 and 18 November 2018.

Singles main-draw entrants

Seeds

 1 Rankings are as of November 5, 2018.

Other entrants
The following players received wildcards into the singles main draw:
  Francisco Cerúndolo
  Juan Pablo Ficovich
  Facundo Mena
  Renzo Olivo

The following player received entry into the singles main draw as an alternate:
  Andrea Collarini

The following players received entry from the qualifying draw:
  Federico Coria
  Orlando Luz
  Bastián Malla
  Gonzalo Villanueva

Champions

Singles

  Pablo Andújar def.  Pedro Cachín 6–3, 6–1.

Doubles

  Guido Andreozzi /  Guillermo Durán def.  Marcelo Demoliner /  Andrés Molteni 6–4, 4–6, [10–3].

References

2018 ATP Challenger Tour
2018